The Guerilla Warfare School was a commando and special operations training centre at Tidal River, Victoria, Australia during the Second World War. The training centre was set up in 1941, known as No. 7 Infantry Training Centre, and the special operations course was run until July 1942, before transferring to the Z Experimental Station, Cairns, Queensland.

See also
Z Special Unit

References

External links
 

Australian Army bases
Military units and formations established in 1941
1941 establishments in Australia